

The Stoddard-Hamilton Glasair III is an American two-seat, high performance homebuilt aircraft designed and built by Stoddard-Hamilton Aircraft of Arlington, Washington as an addition to the Glasair range of aircraft for amateur construction. Glasair I, II and III assets were purchased by Advanced Aero Components in September, 2017.

Design and development
The Glasair III is an all-composite cantilever low-wing monoplane. It is an improved variant of the earlier Glasair II with a retractable landing gear and powered by a  Lycoming IO-540-K1H5 engine. It has two seats side-by-side with dual controls, the aircraft can be fitted with wing tip fuel tanks. Since the purchase of Glasair I, II, and III aircraft by Advanced Aero Components in September, 2017, the Glasair II and III airframes have been substantially upgraded and are to be reproduced in all carbon fibre construction. First kits are due to be released by July 2018.

Specifications

References

Notes

Bibliography

1980s United States civil utility aircraft
Low-wing aircraft
Single-engined tractor aircraft
Glasair III
Homebuilt aircraft